The Texas District and County Attorneys Association, or TDCAA, is a non-profit organization dedicated to serving Texas prosecutors and attorneys in government representation. The TDCAA is based in Austin and serves the people who work in the district and county attorneys offices around the state by:
 producing comprehensive continuing legal education courses for prosecutors, their investigators and key personnel;
 providing technical assistance to the prosecution community and related criminal justice agencies; and
 serving as a liaison between prosecutor and other organizations in the day-to-day administration of criminal justice.

External links
http://www.tdcaa.com/

Legal organizations based in the United States
Law-related professional associations
Organizations based in Austin, Texas